Nicu Ceaușescu (1 September 1951 – 26 September 1996) was a Romanian physicist and communist politician who was the youngest child of Romanian leaders Nicolae and Elena Ceaușescu. He was a close associate of his father's political regime and considered the President's heir presumptive.

Life during communism

According to Ion Mihai Pacepa, Ceaușescu wanted Nicu to become his Foreign Minister and for that, he instructed two high-ranked Party members, Ștefan Andrei and Cornel Pacoste (whom he considered brilliant communist intellectuals) to take care of Nicu's education; Pacepa further claimed that, unlike his older siblings, he disliked school and was allegedly derided by them for never being seen reading a book.

He graduated from Liceul no. 24 (now named Jean Monnet High School) and then studied physics at the University of Bucharest. He was involved in Uniunea Tineretului Comunist while a student, becoming its First Secretary and then Minister of Youth Issues, being elected to the Central Committee of the Romanian Communist Party in 1982.

As an apprentice in politics, he was mentored by Ștefan Andrei, Ion Traian Ștefănescu and Cornel Pacoste. Toward the end of the 1980s, he was made a member of the Executive Committee of the Romanian Communist Party and in 1987 the leader for Sibiu County, being prepared by his parents to be his father's successor.

Post-communist life and legacy
Since high school, Nicu was reputed to be a heavy drinker. Ion Mihai Pacepa, who defected to the United States in 1978, alleged that Nicu scandalized Bucharest with his rapes and car accidents. He claimed that his father heard about Nicu's drinking problem, but his solution was the one given to every problem in Romania: work harder. He also allegedly lost large sums of money gambling around the world. former body double of Uday Hussein, son of Iraqi President claimed that Nicu was good friends with Uday, and the two would visit each other in Switzerland and Monaco.

The documentary Videograms of a Revolution  shows him exhibited as a prisoner on state television on 22 December 1989 after being arrested on accusations of holding children as hostages and other crimes. He was also arrested in 1990 for misuse of government funds under his father's regime, and was sentenced to 20 years in prison. Released in November 1992 because of cirrhosis, he died of the disease four years later, aged 45, in a Vienna hospital.

References

Romanian communists
Children of national leaders
Nicu Ceausescu
People of the Romanian Revolution
University of Bucharest alumni
1951 births
1996 deaths
Deaths from cirrhosis
Romanian politicians convicted of crimes
Romanian prisoners and detainees
Prisoners and detainees of Romania
Politicians from Bucharest
Burials at Ghencea Cemetery